Pittsford is an unincorporated community and census-designated place (CDP) in Hillsdale County in the U.S. state of Michigan.  The population of the CDP was 553 at the 2020 census.  The community is located along M-34 on the border between Jefferson Township to the west and Pittsford Township to the east.

As an unincorporated community, Pittsford has no legal autonomy of its own but does have its own post office with the 49271 ZIP Code.

History
The community was first settled as early as 1833 when Hiram Kidler moved to the area.  It was originally known as Locust Corners.  It was soon renamed to Pittsford by Alpheus Pratt, who came to the area from Pittsford, New York.  A post office named Pittsford opened on September 19, 1840.  The post office closed very briefly from September 12 to December 3, 1845.  The post office was then moved to west part of Pittsford Township and renamed Sparta on January 4, 1846.  The nearby Keene post office was transferred and renamed Pittsford on January 30, 1846.  The community of Pittsford later had a station along the Lake Shore and Michigan Southern Railway.

For the 2020 census, Cambria was included as a newly listed census-designated place, which is included for statistical purposes only.  Cambria continues to remain an unincorporated community with no legal autonomy of its own.

Geography

The community is served by Pittsford Area Schools, which also serves portions of several adjacent townships.

Demographics

Images

References

Census-designated places in Hillsdale County, Michigan
Census-designated places in Michigan
Unincorporated communities in Hillsdale County, Michigan
Unincorporated communities in Michigan
Populated places established in 1833
1833 establishments in Michigan Territory